Pempelia amoenella is a species of snout moth. It is found in Albania, North Macedonia, Greece, Romania, Croatia, Turkey, Kazakhstan and Mongolia.

References

Moths described in 1848
Phycitini
Moths of Europe
Moths of Asia